Samuel King may refer to:

Sam King (golfer) (Samuel Leonard King, 1911–2003), English professional golfer
Sam King (baseball) (Samuel Warren King, 1852–1922), Major League Baseball first baseman
Sam King (cricketer) (Samuel Isaac Michael King, born 2003), English cricketer
Sam Beaver King (1926–2016), first black mayor of Southwark, London
Samuel King (artist) (1748–1819), miniaturist and instructor
Samuel King (minister) (1775–1842), Presbyterian minister
Samuel Archer King (1828–1914), balloonist
Samuel Pailthorpe King (1916–2010), American lawyer and judge on the United States District Court for the District of Hawaii
Samuel Ward King (1786–1851), Governor of Rhode Island 
Samuel Wilder King (1886–1959), eleventh Territorial Governor of Hawai'i 
Samuel William King (1821–1868), English geologist
Samuel G. King (1816–1899), mayor of Philadelphia
"Samuel P. King" and "Samuel S. King", aliases used by Calvin Fairbank while aiding escaped slaves

See also
Samuel King's School, Alston, Cumbria, England